Calvin and Hobbes is a daily American comic strip created by cartoonist Bill Watterson that was syndicated from November 18, 1985, to December 31, 1995. Commonly cited as "the last great newspaper comic", Calvin and Hobbes has enjoyed broad and enduring popularity, influence, and academic and philosophical interest.

Calvin and Hobbes follows the humorous antics of the title characters: Calvin, a precocious, mischievous, and adventurous six-year-old boy; and Hobbes, his sardonic stuffed tiger. Set in the contemporary suburban United States of the 1980s and 90s, the strip depicts Calvin's frequent flights of fancy and friendship with Hobbes. It also examines Calvin's relationships with his long-suffering parents and with his classmates, especially his neighbor Susie Derkins. Hobbes' dual nature is a defining motif for the strip: to Calvin, Hobbes is a living anthropomorphic tiger, while all the other characters see Hobbes as an inanimate stuffed toy. Though the series does not frequently mention specific political figures or contemporary events, it does explore broad issues like environmentalism, public education, and philosophical quandaries.

At the height of its popularity, Calvin and Hobbes was featured in over 2,400 newspapers worldwide. In 2010, reruns of the strip appeared in more than 50 countries, and nearly 45 million copies of the Calvin and Hobbes books had been sold worldwide.

History

Development 

Calvin and Hobbes was conceived when Bill Watterson, while working in an advertising job he detested, began devoting his spare time to developing a newspaper comic for potential syndication. He explored various strip ideas but all were rejected by the syndicates. United Feature Syndicate finally responded positively to one strip called The Doghouse, which featured a side character (the main character's little brother) who had a stuffed tiger. United identified these characters as the strongest and encouraged Watterson to develop them as the centre of their own strip. Though United Feature ultimately rejected the new strip as lacking in marketing potential, Universal Press Syndicate took it up.

Launch and early success (1985–1990) 
The first Calvin and Hobbes strip was published on November 18, 1985 in 35 newspapers. The strip quickly became popular. Within a year of syndication, the strip was published in roughly 250 newspapers and proved to have international appeal with translation and wide circulation outside the United States.

Although Calvin and Hobbes underwent continual artistic development and creative innovation over the period of syndication, the earliest strips demonstrated a remarkable consistency with the latest. Watterson introduced all the major characters within the first three weeks and made no changes to the central cast over the strip's 10-year history. 

By April 5, 1987, Watterson was featured in an article in the Los Angeles Times. Calvin and Hobbes earned Watterson the Reuben Award from the National Cartoonists Society in the Outstanding Cartoonist of the Year category, first in 1986 and again in 1988. He was nominated another time in 1992. The Society awarded him the Humor Comic Strip Award for 1988. Calvin and Hobbes has also won several more awards.

As his creation grew in popularity, there was strong interest from the syndicate to merchandise the characters and expand into other forms of media. Watterson’s contract with the syndicate allowed the characters to be licensed without the creators’ consent as was standard at the time. Nevertheless, Watterson had leverage by threatening to simply walk away from the comic strip.

This dynamic played out in a long and emotionally draining battle between Watterson and his syndicate editors. By 1991, Watterson had achieved his goal of securing a new contract that granted him legal control over his creation and all future licensing arrangements.

Creative control (1991–1995) 
Having achieved his objective of creative control, Watterson's desire for privacy subsequently reasserted itself and he ceased all media interviews, relocated to New Mexico, and largely disappeared from public engagements, refusing to attend the ceremonies of any of the cartooning awards he won. The pressures of the battle over merchandising led to Watterson taking an extended break from May 5, 1991, to February 1, 1992, a move that was virtually unprecedented in the world of syndicated cartoonists.

During Watterson's first sabbatical from the strip, Universal Press Syndicate continued to charge newspapers full price to re-run old Calvin and Hobbes strips. Few editors approved of the move, but the strip was so popular that they had no choice but to continue to run it for fear that competing newspapers might pick it up and draw its fans away. Watterson returned to the strip in 1992 with plans to produce his Sunday strip as an unbreakable half of a newspaper or tabloid page. This made him only the second cartoonist since Garry Trudeau to have sufficient popularity to demand more space and control over the presentation of his work.

Watterson took a second sabbatical from April 3 through December 31, 1994. His return came with an announcement that Calvin and Hobbes would be concluding at the end of 1995. Stating his belief that he had achieved everything that he wanted to within the medium, he announced his intention to work on future projects at a slower pace with fewer artistic compromises.

The final strip ran on Sunday, December 31, 1995, depicting Calvin and Hobbes sledding down a snowy hill after a fresh snowfall with Calvin exclaiming “Let's go exploring!".

Speaking to NPR in 2005, animation critic Charles Solomon opined that the final strip "left behind a hole in the comics page that no strip has been able to fill."

Sunday formatting

Syndicated comics were typically published six times a week in black and white, with a Sunday supplement version in a larger, full color format. This larger format version of the strip was constrained by mandatory layout requirements that made it possible for newspaper editors to format the strip for different page sizes and layouts.

Watterson grew increasingly frustrated by the shrinking of the available space for comics in the newspapers and the mandatory panel divisions that restricted his ability to produce better artwork and more creative storytelling. He lamented that without space for anything more than simple dialogue or sparse artwork, comics as an art form were becoming dilute, bland, and unoriginal.

Watterson longed for the artistic freedom allotted to classic strips such as Little Nemo and Krazy Kat, and in 1989 he gave a sample of what could be accomplished with such liberty in the opening pages of the Sunday strip compilation, The Calvin and Hobbes Lazy Sunday Book—an 8-page previously unpublished Calvin story fully illustrated in watercolor. The same book contained an afterword from the artist himself, reflecting on a time when comic strips were allocated a whole page of the newspaper and every comic was like a "color poster".

Within two years, Watterson was ultimately successful in negotiating a deal that provided him more space and creative freedom. Following his 1991 sabbatical, Universal Press announced that Watterson had decided to sell his Sunday strip as an unbreakable half of a newspaper or tabloid page. Many editors and even a few cartoonists including Bil Keane (The Family Circus) and Bruce Beattie (Snafu) criticized him for what they perceived as arrogance and an unwillingness to abide by the normal practices of the cartoon business. Others, including Bill Amend (Foxtrot), Johnny Hart (BC, Wizard of Id) and Barbara Brandon (Where I'm Coming From) supported him. The American Association of Sunday and Feature Editors even formally requested that Universal reconsider the changes. Watterson's own comments on the matter was that "editors will have to judge for themselves whether or not Calvin and Hobbes deserves the extra space. If they don't think the strip carries its own weight, they don't have to run it." Ultimately only 15 newspapers cancelled the strip in response to the layout changes.

Sabbaticals 
Bill Watterson took two sabbaticals from the daily requirements of producing the strip. The first took place from May 5, 1991, to February 1, 1992, and the second from April 3 through December 31, 1994. These sabbaticals were included in the new contract Watterson managed to negotiate with Universal Features in 1990. The sabbaticals were proposed by the syndicate themselves, who, fearing Watterson's complete burnout, endeavored to get another five years of work from their star artist.

Watterson remains only the third cartoonist with sufficient popularity and stature to receive a sabbatical from their syndicate, the first two being Garry Trudeau (Doonesbury) in 1983 and Gary Larson (The Far Side) in 1989. Typically cartoonists are expected to produce sufficient strips to cover any period they may wish to take off. Watterson's lengthy sabbaticals received some mild criticism from his fellow cartoonists including Greg Evans (Luann); and Charles Schulz (Peanuts), one of Watterson's major artistic influences, even called it a "puzzle". Some cartoonists resented the idea that Watterson worked harder than others, while others supported it. At least one newspaper editor noted that the strip was the most popular in the country and stated he "earned it".

Merchandising
Despite the popularity of Calvin and Hobbes, the strip remains notable for the almost complete lack of official product merchandising. Watterson held that comic strips should stand on their own as an art form and although he did not start out completely opposed to merchandising in all forms (or even for all comic strips), he did reject an early syndication deal that involved incorporating a more marketable, licensed character into his strip. In spite of being an unproven cartoonist, and having been flown all the way to New York to discuss the proposal, Watterson reflexively resented the idea of "cartooning by committee" and turned it down.

When Calvin and Hobbes was accepted by Universal Syndicate, and began to grow in popularity, Watterson found himself at odds with the syndicate, which urged him to begin merchandising the characters and touring the country to promote the first collections of comic strips. Watterson refused, believing that the integrity of the strip and its artist would be undermined by commercialization, which he saw as a major negative influence in the world of cartoon art, and that licensing his character would only violate the spirit of his work. He gave an example of this in discussing his opposition to a Hobbes plush toy: that if the essence of Hobbes' nature in the strip is that it remain unresolved whether he is a real tiger or a stuffed toy, then creating a real stuffed toy would only destroy the magic. However, having initially signed away control over merchandising in his initial contract with the syndicate, Watterson commenced a lengthy and emotionally draining battle with Universal to gain control over his work. Ultimately Universal did not approve any products against Watterson's wishes, understanding that, unlike other comic strips, it would be near impossible to separate the creator from the strip if Watterson chose to walk away.

One estimate places the value of licensing revenue forgone by Watterson at $300–$400 million. Almost no legitimate Calvin and Hobbes merchandise exists. Exceptions produced during the strip's original run include two 16-month calendars (1988–89 and 1989–90), a t-shirt for the Smithsonian Exhibit, Great American Comics: 100 Years of Cartoon Art (1990) and the textbook Teaching with Calvin and Hobbes, which has been described as "perhaps the most difficult piece of official Calvin and Hobbes memorabilia to find." In 2010, Watterson did allow his characters to be included in a series of United States Postal Service stamps honoring five classic American comics. Licensed prints of Calvin and Hobbes were made available and have also been included in various academic works.

The strip's immense popularity has led to the appearance of various counterfeit items such as window decals and T-shirts that often feature crude humor, binge drinking and other themes that are not found in Watterson's work. Images from one strip in which Calvin and Hobbes dance to loud music at night were commonly used for copyright violations. After threat of a lawsuit alleging infringement of copyright and trademark, some sticker makers replaced Calvin with a different boy, while other makers made no changes. Watterson wryly commented, "I clearly miscalculated how popular it would be to show Calvin urinating on a Ford logo," but later added, "long after the strip is forgotten, [they] are my ticket to immortality".

Animation
Watterson has expressed admiration for animation as an artform. In a 1989 interview in The Comics Journal he described the appeal of being able to do things with a moving image that cannot be done by a simple drawing: the distortion, the exaggeration and the control over the length of time an event is viewed. However, although the visual possibilities of animation appealed to Watterson, the idea of finding a voice for Calvin made him uncomfortable, as did the idea of working with a team of animators. Ultimately, Calvin and Hobbes was never made into an animated series. Watterson later stated in The Calvin and Hobbes Tenth Anniversary Book that he liked the fact that his strip was a "low-tech, one-man operation," and that he took great pride in the fact that he drew every line and wrote every word on his own. Calls from major Hollywood figures interested in an adaptation of his work, including Jim Henson, George Lucas and Steven Spielberg, were never returned and in a 2013 interview Watterson stated that he had "zero interest" in an animated adaptation as there was really no upside for him in doing so.

Style and influences
The strip borrows several elements and themes from three major influences: Walt Kelly's Pogo, George Herriman's Krazy Kat and Charles M. Schulz's Peanuts. Schulz and Kelly particularly influenced Watterson's outlook on comics during his formative years.

Notable elements of Watterson's artistic style are his characters' diverse and often exaggerated expressions (particularly those of Calvin), elaborate and bizarre backgrounds for Calvin's flights of imagination, expressions of motion and frequent visual jokes and metaphors. In the later years of the strip, with more panel space available for his use, Watterson experimented more freely with different panel layouts, art styles, stories without dialogue and greater use of white space. He also experimented with his tools, once inking a strip with a stick from his yard in order to achieve a particular look. He also makes a point of not showing certain things explicitly: the "Noodle Incident" and the children's book Hamster Huey and the Gooey Kablooie are left to the reader's imagination, where Watterson was sure they would be "more outrageous" than he could portray.

Production and technique 
Watterson's technique started with minimalist pencil sketches drawn with a light pencil (though the larger Sunday strips often required more elaborate work) on a piece of Bristol board, with his brand of choice being Strathmore because he felt it held the drawings better on the page as opposed to the cheaper brands (Watterson said he initially used any cheap pad of Bristol board his local supply store had but switched to Strathmore after he found himself growing more and more displeased with the results). He would then use a small sable brush and India ink to fill in the rest of the drawing, saying that he did not want to simply trace over his penciling and thus make the inking more spontaneous. He lettered dialogue with a Rapidograph fountain pen, and he used a crowquill pen for odds and ends. Mistakes were covered with various forms of correction fluid, including the type used on typewriters. Watterson was careful in his use of color, often spending a great deal of time in choosing the right colors to employ for the weekly Sunday strip; his technique was to cut the color tabs the syndicate sent him into individual squares, lay out the colors, and then paint a watercolor approximation of the strip on tracing paper over the Bristol board and then mark the strip accordingly before sending it on. When Calvin and Hobbes began there were 64 colors available for the Sunday strips. For the later Sunday strips Watterson had 125 colors as well as the ability to fade the colors into each other.

Main characters

Calvin

Calvin, named after the 16th-century theologian John Calvin, is a six-year-old boy with spiky blond hair and a distinctive red-and-black striped shirt, black pants and sneakers. Despite his poor grades in school, Calvin demonstrates his intelligence through a sophisticated vocabulary, philosophical mind and creative/artistic talent. Watterson described Calvin as having "not much of a filter between his brain and his mouth", a "little too intelligent for his age", lacking in restraint and not yet having the experience to "know the things that you shouldn't do." The comic strip largely revolves around Calvin's inner world and his largely antagonistic experiences with those outside of it (fellow students, authority figures and his parents).

Hobbes

From Calvin's point of view, Hobbes is an anthropomorphic tiger much larger than Calvin and full of independent attitudes and ideas. When the scene includes any other human, they see merely a stuffed animal, usually seated at an off-kilter angle and blankly staring into space. The true nature of the character is never resolved, instead as Watterson describes, a 'grown-up' version of reality is juxtaposed against Calvin's, with the reader left to "decide which is truer". Hobbes is based on a cat Watterson owned, a grey tabby named Sprite. Sprite inspired the length of Hobbes' body as well as his personality. Although Hobbes' humor stems from acting like a human, Watterson maintained Sprite's feline attitude.

Hobbes is named after 17th-century philosopher Thomas Hobbes, who held what Watterson describes as "a dim view of human nature." He typically exhibits a greater understanding of consequences than Calvin, but rarely intervenes in Calvin's activities beyond a few oblique warnings. He often likes to sneak up and pounce on Calvin, especially at the front door when Calvin is returning home from school. The friendship between the two characters provides the core dynamic of the strip.

Calvin's parents

Calvin's mother and father are typical middle-class parents who are relatively down to earth and whose sensible attitudes serve as a foil for Calvin's outlandish behavior. Calvin's father is a patent attorney (like Watterson's own father), while his mother is a stay-at-home mom. Both parents are unnamed throughout the entire strip, as Watterson insists, "As far as the strip is concerned, they are important only as Calvin's mom and dad."

Watterson recounts that some fans are angered by the sometimes sardonic way that Calvin's parents respond to him. In response, Watterson defends what Calvin's parents do, remarking that in the case of parenting a kid like Calvin, "I think they do a better job than I would." Calvin's father is overly concerned with "character building" activities in a number of strips, either in the things he makes Calvin do or in the austere eccentricities of his own lifestyle.

Susie Derkins

Susie Derkins, who first appears early in the strip and is the only important character with both a first and last name, lives on Calvin's street and is one of his classmates.  Her last name apparently derives from the pet beagle owned by Watterson's wife's family.

Susie is studious and polite (though she can be aggressive if sufficiently provoked), and she likes to play house or host tea parties with her stuffed animals. She also plays imaginary games with Calvin in which she acts as a high-powered lawyer or politician and wants Calvin to pretend to be her househusband. Though both of them are typically loath to admit it, Calvin and Susie exhibit many common traits and inclinations. For example, the reader occasionally sees Susie with a stuffed rabbit named "Mr. Bun." Much like Calvin, Susie has a mischievous (and sometimes aggressive) streak as well, which the reader witnesses whenever she subverts Calvin's attempts to cheat on school tests by feeding him incorrect answers, or whenever she fights back after Calvin attacks her with snowballs or water balloons.

Hobbes often openly expresses romantic feelings for Susie, to Calvin's disgust. In contrast, Calvin started a club (of which he and Hobbes are the only members) that he calls G.R.O.S.S. (Get Rid Of Slimy GirlS) and, while holding "meetings" in Calvin's tree house or in the "box of secrecy" in Calvin's room, they usually come up with some plot against Susie. In one instance, Calvin steals one of Susie's dolls and holds it for ransom, only to have Susie retaliate by nabbing Hobbes. Watterson admits that Calvin and Susie have a nascent crush on each other and that Susie is a reference to the type of woman whom Watterson himself found attractive and eventually married.

Secondary characters
 Calvin also interacts with a handful of secondary characters. Several of these, including Rosalyn, his babysitter; Miss Wormwood, his teacher; and Moe, the school bully, recur regularly through the duration of the strip.

Recurring elements and themes

Art and academia
Watterson used the strip to poke fun at the art world, principally through Calvin's unconventional creations of snowmen but also through other expressions of childhood art. When Miss Wormwood complains that he is wasting class time drawing impossible things (a Stegosaurus in a rocket ship, for example), Calvin proclaims himself "on the cutting edge of the avant-garde." He begins exploring the medium of snow when a warm day melts his snowman. His next sculpture "speaks to the horror of our own mortality, inviting the viewer to contemplate the evanescence of life." In later strips, Calvin's creative instincts diversify to include sidewalk drawings (or, as he terms them, examples of "suburban postmodernism").

Watterson also lampooned the academic world. In one example, Calvin carefully crafts an "artist's statement", claiming that such essays convey more messages than artworks themselves ever do (Hobbes blandly notes, "You misspelled Weltanschauung"). He indulges in what Watterson calls "pop psychobabble" to justify his destructive rampages and shift blame to his parents, citing "toxic codependency." In one instance, he pens a book report based on the theory that the purpose of academic writing is to "inflate weak ideas, obscure poor reasoning and inhibit clarity," entitled The Dynamics of Interbeing and Monological Imperatives in Dick and Jane: A Study in Psychic Transrelational Gender Modes. Displaying his creation to Hobbes, he remarks, "Academia, here I come!" Watterson explains that he adapted this jargon (and similar examples from several other strips) from an actual book of art criticism.

Overall, Watterson's satirical essays serve to attack both sides, criticizing both the commercial mainstream and the artists who are supposed to be "outside" it. The strip on Sunday, June 21, 1992, criticized the naming of The Big Bang theory as not evocative of the wonders behind it and coined the term "Horrendous Space Kablooie", an alternative that achieved some informal popularity among scientists and was often shortened to "the HSK." The term has also been referred to in newspapers, books and university courses.

There are many recurring gags in the strip, some in reality and others in Calvin's imagination. These are as follows:

Calvin's alter-egos
Calvin imagines himself as many great creatures and other people, including dinosaurs, elephants, jungle-farers and superheroes. Three of his alter egos are well-defined and recurrent:
"Spaceman Spiff" is a heroic spacefarer who narrates his adventures in the third person. As Spiff, Calvin battles aliens (typically his parents or teacher, but also sometimes other kids his age) with a ray gun known as a "zorcher" (later "frap-ray blaster", "death ray blaster" or "atomic napalm neutralizer") and travels to distant planets (his house, school or neighborhood), often crashing unhurt on a planet. Calvin's self-narration as Spaceman Spiff is frequently riddled with alliteration: "Zounds! Zorched by Zarches, Spaceman Spiff's crippled craft crashes on planet Plootarg!"  Watterson has stated the idea of Spaceman Spiff came from an earlier attempt as a cartoon, and is meant as a parody of Flash Gordon.
 "Tracer Bullet" is a hardboiled private eye, who says he has eight slugs in him ("One's lead, and the rest are bourbon."). In one story, Bullet is called to a case in which a "pushy dame" (Calvin's mother) accuses him of destroying an expensive lamp (broken during an indoor football game between Calvin and Hobbes). Later, he is snatched by the pushy dame's "hired goon" (Calvin's father having a talk with him).  In another, he "investigates" a math word problem during class, "closing the case" with an answer of 1,000,000,000 when the correct response was 15. He made his debut when Calvin donned a fedora in order to hide a terrible haircut Hobbes had given him. These strips are drawn in elaborate, shadowy black-and-white that evoke film noir. Watterson did not attempt Tracer Bullet stories often, due to the time-consuming way the strip needed to be drawn and inked.

 "Stupendous Man" is a superhero who wears a mask and a cape (made by Calvin's mother) and narrates his own adventures. While Calvin is in character as Stupendous Man, he refers to his alter ego as a mild-mannered millionaire playboy. Stupendous Man almost always "suffers defeat" at the hands of his opponent. When Hobbes asks if Stupendous Man has ever won any battles, Calvin says all his battles are "moral victories." Stupendous Man's nemeses include "Mom-Lady" (Calvin's mom), "Annoying Girl" (Susie Derkins), "Crab Teacher" (Miss Wormwood) and "Baby-Sitter Girl" (Rosalyn). Some of the "super powers" of the villains have been revealed: Mom-Lady has a "mind scrambling eyeball ray" that wills the victim to "do her nefarious bidding"; and Baby Sitter Girl has a similar power of using a "psycho beam" which weakens "Stupendous Man's stupendous will". The "powers" of Annoying Girl and Crab Teacher are never revealed. Calvin often tries to pretend he and "Stupendous Man" are two different people, but it fails to work. Stupendous Man has multiple "superpowers", including, but not limited to, super strength, the ability to fly, various vision powers such as "high-speed vision", "muscles of magnitude" and a stomach of steel.

Cardboard boxes

Calvin also has several adventures involving corrugated cardboard boxes, which he adapts for many imaginative and elaborate uses. In one strip, when Calvin shows off his Transmogrifier, a device that transforms its user into any desired creature or item, Hobbes remarks, "It's amazing what they do with corrugated cardboard these days." Calvin is able to change the function of the boxes by rewriting the label and flipping the box onto another side. In this way, a box can be used not only for its conventional purposes (a storage container for water balloons, for example), but also as a flying time machine, a duplicator, a transmogrifier or, with the attachment of a few wires and a colander, a "Cerebral Enhance-o-tron."

In the real world, Calvin's antics with his box have had varying effects. When he transmogrified into a tiger, he still appeared as a regular human child to his parents. However, in a story where he made several duplicates of himself, his parents are seen interacting with what does seem like multiple Calvins, including in a strip where two of him are seen in the same panel as his father. It is ultimately unknown what his parents do or do not see, as Calvin tries to hide most of his creations (or conceal their effects) so as not to traumatize them.

In addition, Calvin uses a cardboard box as a sidewalk kiosk to sell things. Often, Calvin offers merchandise no one would want, such as "suicide drink", "a swift kick in the butt" for one dollar or a "frank appraisal of your looks" for fifty cents. In one strip, he sells "happiness" for ten cents,  hitting the customer in the face with a water balloon and explaining that he meant his own happiness. In another strip, he sold "insurance", firing a slingshot at those who refused to buy it. In some strips, he tried to sell "great ideas" and, in one earlier strip, he attempted to sell the family car to obtain money for a grenade launcher. In yet another strip, he sells "life" for five cents, where the customer receives nothing in return, which, in Calvin's opinion, is life.

The box has also functioned as an alternate secret meeting place for G.R.O.S.S., as the "Box of Secrecy".

Calvinball

Calvinball is an improvisational sport/game introduced in a 1990 storyline that involved Calvin's negative experience of joining the school baseball team. Calvinball is a nomic or self-modifying game, a contest of wits, skill and creativity rather than stamina or athletic skill. The game is portrayed as a rebellion against conventional team sports and became a staple of the final 5 years of the comic. The only consistent rules of the game are that Calvinball may never be played with the same rules twice and that each participant must wear a mask.

When asked how to play, Watterson stated: "It's pretty simple: you make up the rules as you go." In most appearances of the game, a comical array of conventional and non-conventional sporting equipment is involved, including a croquet set, a badminton set, assorted flags, bags, signs, a hobby horse, water buckets and balloons, with humorous allusions to unseen elements such as "time-fracture wickets". Scoring is portrayed as arbitrary and nonsensical ("Q to 12" and "oogy to boogy") and the lack of fixed rules leads to lengthy argument between the participants as to who scored, where the boundaries are, and when the game is finished.  Usually, the contest results in Calvin being outsmarted by Hobbes. The game has been described in one academic work not as a new game based on fragments of an older one, but as the "constant connecting and disconnecting of parts, the constant evasion of rules or guidelines based on collective creativity."

Snowmen and other snow art

Calvin often creates horrendous/dark humor scenes with his snowmen and other snow sculptures. He uses the snowman for social commentary, revenge or pure enjoyment. Examples include Snowman Calvin being yelled at by Snowman Dad to shovel the snow; one snowman eating snow cones scooped out of a second snowman, who is lying on the ground with an ice-cream scoop in his back; a "snowman house of horror"; and snowmen representing people he hates. "The ones I really hate are small, so they'll melt faster," he says. There was even an occasion on which Calvin accidentally brought a snowman to life and it made itself and a small army into "deranged mutant killer monster snow goons."

Calvin's snow art is often used as a commentary on art in general. For example, Calvin has complained more than once about the lack of originality in other people's snow art and compared it with his own grotesque snow sculptures. In one of these instances, Calvin and Hobbes claim to be the sole guardians of high culture; in another, Hobbes admires Calvin's willingness to put artistic integrity above marketability, causing Calvin to reconsider and make an ordinary snowman.

Wagon and sled rides
Calvin and Hobbes frequently ride downhill in a wagon or sled (depending on the season), as a device to add some physical comedy to the strip and because, according to Watterson, "it's a lot more interesting ... than talking heads." While the ride is sometimes the focus of the strip, it also frequently serves as a counterpoint or visual metaphor while Calvin ponders the meaning of life, death, God, philosophy or a variety of other weighty subjects. Many of their rides end in spectacular crashes which leave them battered, beaten up and broken, a fact which convinces Hobbes to sometimes hop off before a ride even begins. In the final strip, Calvin and Hobbes depart on their sled to go exploring. This theme is similar (perhaps even an homage) to scenes in Walt Kelly's Pogo.  Calvin and Hobbes' sled has been described as the most famous sled in American arts since Citizen Kane.

G.R.O.S.S. (Get Rid of Slimy GirlS) 
G.R.O.S.S. (which stands for Get Rid Of Slimy GirlS or "otherwise it doesn't spell anything") is a club in which Calvin and Hobbes are the only members. The club was founded in the garage of their house, but to clear space for its activities, Calvin and (purportedly) Hobbes push Calvin's parents' car, causing it to roll into a ditch (but not suffer damage); the incident prompts the duo to change the club's location to Calvin's treehouse. They hold meetings that involve finding ways to annoy and discomfort Susie Derkins, a girl and enemy of their club. Notable actions include planting a fake secret tape near her in attempt to draw her in to a trap, trapping her in a closet at their house and creating elaborate water balloon traps. Calvin gave himself and Hobbes important positions in the club, Calvin being "Dictator-for-Life" and Hobbes being "President-and-First-Tiger". They go into Calvin's treehouse for their club meetings and often get into fights during them. The password to get into the treehouse is intentionally long and difficult, which has on at least one occasion ruined Calvin's plans. As Hobbes is able to climb the tree without the rope, he is usually the one who comes up with the password, which often involves heaping praise upon tigers. An example of this can be seen in the comic strip where Calvin, rushing to get into the treehouse to throw things at a passing Susie Derkins, insults Hobbes, who is in the treehouse and thus has to let down the rope. Hobbes forces Calvin to say the password for insulting him. By the time Susie arrives, in time to hear Calvin saying some of the password, causing him to stumble, Calvin is on "Verse Seven: Tigers are perfect!/The E-pit-o-me/of good looks and grace/and quiet..uh..um..dignity". The opportunity to pelt Susie with something having passed, Calvin threatens to turn Hobbes into a rug.

Books

There are 18 Calvin and Hobbes books, published from 1987 to 1997. These include 11 collections, which form a complete archive of the newspaper strips, except for a single daily strip from November 28, 1985. (The collections do contain a strip for this date, but it is not the same strip that appeared in some newspapers.) Treasuries usually combine the two preceding collections with bonus material and include color reprints of Sunday comics.

Watterson included some new material in the treasuries. In The Essential Calvin and Hobbes, which includes cartoons from the collections Calvin and Hobbes and Something Under the Bed Is Drooling, the back cover features a scene of a giant Calvin rampaging through a town. The scene is based on Watterson's home town of Chagrin Falls, Ohio, and Calvin is holding the Chagrin Falls Popcorn Shop, an iconic candy and ice cream shop overlooking the town's namesake falls. Several of the treasuries incorporate additional poetry; The Indispensable Calvin and Hobbes book features a set of poems, ranging from just a few lines to an entire page, that cover topics such as Calvin's mother's "hindsight" and exploring the woods. In The Essential Calvin and Hobbes, Watterson presents a long poem explaining a night's battle against a monster from Calvin's perspective. The Authoritative Calvin and Hobbes includes a story based on Calvin's use of the Transmogrifier to finish his reading homework.

A complete collection of Calvin and Hobbes strips, in three hardcover volumes totaling 1440 pages, was released on October 4, 2005, by Andrews McMeel Publishing. It includes color prints of the art used on paperback covers, the treasuries' extra illustrated stories and poems and a new introduction by Bill Watterson in which he talks about his inspirations and his story leading up to the publication of the strip. The alternate 1985 strip is still omitted, and three other strips (January 7 and November 24, 1987, and November 25, 1988) have altered dialogue. A four-volume paperback version was released November 13, 2012.

To celebrate the release (which coincided with the strip's 20th anniversary and the tenth anniversary of its absence from newspapers), Bill Watterson answered 15 questions submitted by readers.

Early books were printed in smaller format in black and white. These were later reproduced in twos in color in the "Treasuries" (Essential, Authoritative and Indispensable), except for the contents of Attack of the Deranged Mutant Killer Monster Snow Goons. Those Sunday strips were not reprinted in color until the Complete collection was finally published in 2005.

Watterson claims he named the books the "Essential, Authoritative and Indispensable" because, as he says in The Calvin and Hobbes Tenth Anniversary Book, the books are "obviously none of these things."

Reception
Reviewing Calvin and Hobbes in 1990, Entertainment Weekly Ken Tucker gave the strip an A+ rating, writing "Watterson summons up the pain and confusion of childhood as much as he does its innocence and fun."

Academic response
In 1993, paleontologist and paleoartist Gregory S. Paul praised Bill Watterson for the scientific accuracy of the dinosaurs appearing in Calvin and Hobbes.

In her 1994 book When Toys Come Alive, Lois Rostow Kuznets theorizes that Hobbes serves both as a figure of Calvin's childish fantasy life and as an outlet for the expression of libidinous desires more associated with adults. Kuznets also analyzes Calvin's other fantasies, suggesting that they are a second tier of fantasies utilized in places like school where transitional objects such as Hobbes would not be socially acceptable.

Political scientist James Q. Wilson, in a paean to Calvin and Hobbes upon Watterson's decision to end the strip in 1995, characterized it as "our only popular explication of the moral philosophy of Aristotle."

Alisa White Coleman analyzed the strip's underlying messages concerning ethics and values in "'Calvin and Hobbes': A Critique of Society's Values," published in the Journal of Mass Media Ethics in 2000.

A collection of original Sunday strips was exhibited at Ohio State University's Billy Ireland Cartoon Library & Museum in 2001. Watterson himself selected the strips and provided his own commentary for the exhibition catalog, which was later published by Andrews McMeel as Calvin and Hobbes: Sunday Pages 1985–1995.

Since the discontinuation of Calvin and Hobbes, individual strips have been licensed for reprint in schoolbooks, including the Christian homeschooling book The Fallacy Detective in 2002, and the university-level philosophy reader Open Questions: Readings for Critical Thinking and Writing in 2005; in the latter, the ethical views of Watterson and his characters Calvin and Hobbes are discussed in relation to the views of professional philosophers. Since 2009, Twitter users have indicated that Calvin and Hobbes strips have appeared in textbooks for subjects in the sciences, social sciences, mathematics, philosophy and foreign language.

In a 2009 evaluation of the entire body of Calvin and Hobbes strips using grounded theory methodology, Christijan D. Draper found that: "Overall, Calvin and Hobbes suggests that meaningful time use is a key attribute of a life well lived," and that "the strip suggests one way to assess the meaning associated with time use is through preemptive retrospection by which a person looks at current experiences through the lens of an anticipated future..."

Jamey Heit's Imagination and Meaning in Calvin and Hobbes, a critical and academic analysis of the strip, was published in 2012.

Calvin and Hobbes strips were again exhibited at the Billy Ireland Cartoon Library & Museum at Ohio State University in 2014, in an exhibition entitled Exploring Calvin and Hobbes. An exhibition catalog by the same title, which also contained an interview with Watterson conducted by Jenny Robb, the curator of the museum, was published by Andrews McMeel in 2015.

Legacy

Years after its original newspaper run, Calvin and Hobbes has continued to exert influence in entertainment, art and fandom.

In television, Calvin and Hobbes have been satirically depicted in stop motion animation in the 2006 Robot Chicken episode "Lust for Puppets," and in traditional animation in the 2009 Family Guy episode "Not All Dogs Go to Heaven." In the 2013 Community episode "Paranormal Parentage," the characters Abed Nadir (Danny Pudi) and Troy Barnes (Donald Glover) dress as Calvin and Hobbes, respectively, for Halloween.

British artists, merchandisers, booksellers, and philosophers were interviewed for a 2009 BBC Radio 4 half-hour programme about the abiding popularity of the comic strip, narrated by Phill Jupitus.

The first book-length study of the strip, Looking for Calvin and Hobbes: The Unconventional Story of Bill Watterson and His Revolutionary Comic Strip by Nevin Martell, was first published in 2009; an expanded edition was published in 2010. The book chronicles Martell's quest to tell the story of Calvin and Hobbes and Watterson through research and interviews with people connected to the cartoonist and his work. The director of the later documentary Dear Mr. Watterson referenced Looking for Calvin and Hobbes in discussing the production of the movie, and Martell appears in the film.

The American documentary film Dear Mr. Watterson, released in 2013, explores the impact and legacy of Calvin and Hobbes through interviews with authors, curators, historians, and numerous professional cartoonists.

The enduring significance of Calvin and Hobbes to international cartooning was recognized by the jury of the Angoulême International Comics Festival in 2014 by the awarding of its Grand Prix to Watterson, only the fourth American to ever receive the honor (after Will Eisner, Robert Crumb, and Art Spiegelman).

From 2016 to 2021, author Berkeley Breathed included Calvin and Hobbes in various Bloom County cartoons. He launched the first cartoon on April Fool's Day 2016 and jokingly issued a statement suggesting that he had acquired Calvin and Hobbes from Bill Watterson, who was "out of the Arizona facility, continent and looking forward to some well-earned financial security."  While bearing Watterson's signature and drawing style as well as featuring characters from both Calvin and Hobbes and Breathed's Bloom County, it is unclear whether Watterson had any input into these cartoons or not.

Calvin and Hobbes remains the most viewed comic on GoComics, which cycles through old strips with an approximately 30-year delay.

Grown-up Calvin
A number of artists and cartoonists have created unofficial works portraying Calvin as a teenager/adult; the concept has also inspired writers.

In 2011, a comic strip appeared by cartoonists Dan and Tom Heyerman called Hobbes and Bacon. The strip depicts Calvin as an adult, married to Susie Derkins with a young daughter named after philosopher Francis Bacon, to whom Calvin gives Hobbes. Though consisting of only four strips originally, Hobbes and Bacon received considerable attention when it appeared and was continued by other cartoonists and artists.

A novel titled Calvin by CLA Young Adult Book Award–winning author Martine Leavitt was published in 2015. The story tells of seventeen-year-old Calvin—who was born on the day that Calvin and Hobbes ended, and who has now been diagnosed with schizophrenia—and his hallucination of Hobbes, his childhood stuffed tiger. With his friend Susie, who might also be a hallucination, Calvin sets off to find Bill Watterson in the hope that the cartoonist can provide aid for Calvin's condition.

The titular character of the comic strip Frazz has been noted for his similar appearance and personality to a grown-up Calvin. Creator Jef Mallett has stated that although Watterson is an inspiration to him, the similarities are unintentional.

References

Bibliography

Calvin and Hobbes at Don Markstein's Toonopedia. Archived from the original on April 13, 2012.

External links

1985 comics debuts
1995 comics endings
 
American comic strips
Gag-a-day comics
Children's fiction books
Comic strip duos
Comics set in the United States
Fictional tigers
Sentient toys in fiction
Works about friendship
Comics characters introduced in 1985